Michal Escapa is a former Israeli Paralympic champion.

The wrong reports
Since at the dawn of the Paralympic Games there was no precision in reporting the results of the competitions, the Israeli athlete was indicated with the Italian nationality and without prename (and so she is mentioned in the International Paralympic Committee of the Italian Paralympic Committee web sites) for the reports of the Swimming at the 1964 Summer Paralympics where she won two bronze medals, simply reported as Escapa and not as Michal Escapa. However, as can be seen from a 1968 Israeli newspaper reporting an interview with the athlete, she was the same athlete who had won medals in swimming and table tennis in Tokyo 1964.

Biography
Escapa was born in France, immigrating to Israel as an orphan after the Second World War. At the age of 15 she was affected by polio and paralyzed in both legs and one of her arms. She studied in Jerusalem and was certified as an accountant, moving in 1962 to live in Holon and practice sports at the Israel Sports Center for the Disabled.

The national champion in wheelchair table tennis, Escapa competed in the Stoke Mandeville Games and in all four Summer Paralympics from 1964 to 1976. An accomplished table tennis player, she won a medal in each games: Gold in 1976, silver in 1968 and bronze in 1964 and 1972. During the 1972 Summer Paralympics she also competed in archery, finishing before last.

Achievements

See also
 French Jews in Israel

References

External links
 
 Michal Escapa at Paralympic.org

Notes

Israeli female archers
Israeli women's wheelchair basketball players
Israeli female swimmers
Israeli table tennis players
Archers at the 1972 Summer Paralympics
Paralympic archers of Israel
Swimmers at the 1964 Summer Paralympics
Paralympic swimmers of Israel
Table tennis players at the 1964 Summer Paralympics
Table tennis players at the 1968 Summer Paralympics
Table tennis players at the 1972 Summer Paralympics
Table tennis players at the 1976 Summer Paralympics
Paralympic table tennis players of Israel
Wheelchair basketball players at the 1968 Summer Paralympics
Paralympic wheelchair basketball players of Israel
Paralympic medalists in swimming
Paralympic medalists in table tennis
Paralympic medalists in wheelchair basketball
Medalists at the 1964 Summer Paralympics
Medalists at the 1968 Summer Paralympics
Medalists at the 1972 Summer Paralympics
Medalists at the 1976 Summer Paralympics
Paralympic gold medalists for Israel
Paralympic silver medalists for Israel
Paralympic bronze medalists for Israel
Wheelchair category Paralympic competitors
20th-century French Jews
French emigrants to Israel
Jewish swimmers
Living people
1937 births